Cyclodinus californicus is a species of antlike flower beetle in the family Anthicidae. It is found in the Caribbean Sea, Central America, and North America.

References

Further reading

 
 

Anthicidae
Articles created by Qbugbot
Beetles described in 1849
Beetles of North America
Beetles of Central America